Ole Nicolay Torp (born 17 September 1951) is a Norwegian former television presenter and correspondent.

He was born in Bergen, and started his journalistic career in Bergens Arbeiderblad. After a stint in Dagbladet he was hired in the Norwegian Broadcasting Corporation (NRK). He served as the channel's correspondent in Washington, DC from 1998 to 2002 and in Asia from 2007 to 2010. From 2010 to 2015 he presented the debate show Aktuelt, superseded by a one-on-one talk show in 2015 called Torp.

References 

1951 births
Living people
Mass media people from Bergen
Journalists from Bergen
Norwegian television presenters
NRK people
Norwegian television reporters and correspondents
Norwegian expatriates in China
Norwegian expatriates in the United States